Uruq may refer to:

Uruk, in Sumeria
`Uruq, in Yemen
Al `Uruq, in Yemen
Varuq, in Iran